The 2016–17 Australian region cyclone season, despite a very high number of tropical lows, was a slightly below-average season in terms of activity, with nine tropical cyclones, three of which intensified further into severe tropical cyclones; though it was much more active than the previous season. The season was the first to have a severe tropical cyclone since the 2014–15 season. It was the period of the year when most tropical cyclones form in the Southern Indian Ocean and Pacific Oceans between 90°E and 160°E. The season officially ran from 1 November 2016 to 30 April 2017, however, a tropical cyclone could form at any time between 1 July 2016 and 30 June 2017 and would count towards the season total. The first named storm, Yvette, developed during 21 December, and the final named storm, Greg, left the region on 3 May as a remnant low. This season was also the second-costliest tropical cyclone season on record in the Australian region basin, behind only the 2010–11 season, with a total of AUD$3.7 billion (US$2.82 billion) in damages incurred by the various storms, mostly from Cyclone Debbie.

During the season, tropical cyclones were officially monitored by one of the five Tropical Cyclone Warning Centres (TCWCs) that operated in this region. Three of the five centres were operated by the Australian Bureau of Meteorology (BoM) in Perth, Darwin, and Brisbane, while the other two were operated by the National Weather Service of Papua New Guinea in Port Moresby and the Indonesian Agency for Meteorology, Climatology and Geophysics in Jakarta, Indonesia. The United States' Joint Typhoon Warning Center (JTWC) and other national meteorological services, including Météo-France, also monitored the basin during the season.



Seasonal forecasts

After the least active season on record had occurred during the previous season, the BoM issued five tropical cyclone outlooks for the Australian region during October 2016. Each one of these forecasts was for the entire tropical cyclone year between July 2016 and June 2017 took into account various factors, including the latest neutral to weak La Niña conditions that had been observed in the tropical Pacific Ocean. The outlooks indicated that an above-average number of tropical cyclones were likely for the basin as a whole and the Northwestern sub-region. It was also predicted that the first tropical cyclone landfall on Australia would take place during December 2016. For the Western region between 90°E and 125°E, the BoM forecast that the area would also see activity near its average of 7, with a 59% chance of an above average number of tropical cyclones occurring. TCWC Perth also noted that there was a likelihood of two tropical cyclones and a significant likelihood of at least one severe tropical cyclone impacting Western Australia. They also noted that the number of significant cyclones and flood impacts had been well below average over the last five seasons. For the North-Western sub-region between 105°E and 130°E, it was predicted that activity would be above average, with a 63% chance of above-average tropical cyclone activity. The Northern Territory, which was defined as being between as being 125°E and 142.5°E, had a 56% chance of an above-average season. The Eastern region between 142.5°E and 160°E was predicted to have a near-normal tropical cyclone season, with a 58% chance of above-average tropical cyclone activity.

Seasonal summary

Despite a weak season with only 8 named tropical cyclones, the BoM monitored a total of 30 tropical lows, which is the highest recorded in a season. The 2016–17 season opened with a tropical system in the Western Region on 23 September, just more than a month before the official start of the season. After three months, with the development of some tropical lows, the first named tropical cyclone, Yvette, developed on 21 December. About four-and-a-half months later, on 3 May, the season concluded when Ex-Tropical Cyclone Greg moved out of the basin.

Systems

Tropical Low 06U

The system subsequently made landfall on the Kimberley and degenerated into a deep monsoonal low, remaining slow-moving over north-western Australia for several days. The low subsequently started to move southwards during 25 December, as it absorbed the remnants of Tropical Cyclone Yvette. The remnants of 06U crossed Southern Australia during 27–28 December, before being absorbed by another area of low pressure which approached 06U from southern Western Australia during 30 December. This system subsequently consolidated in the Great Australian Bight and moved south-eastwards, where it passed to the west of Tasmania before it moved into the Tasman Sea during 31 December.

Tropical Cyclone Yvette

Soon after, the JTWC declared the system as a tropical storm and designated it as 02S. By 21 December, it had strengthened into a Category 1 tropical cyclone on the Australian tropical cyclone intensity scale as persistent deep convection developed, and the BoM named it Yvette. Remaining quasi-stationary under strong wind shear, convection from Yvette soon weakened; simultaneously, the storm started to move southeastwards. By 23 December, the BoM had downgraded Yvette to a tropical low as dry air began to be wrap into the centre. Later the same day, both the JTWC and the BoM issued their final bulletin on Yvette.

Tropical Low 09U

On 3 January, TCWC Perth started to monitor a tropical low to the northwest of the Western Region. The tropical low meandered southwards as it was over in favourable conditions. By 9 January, the system was designated as 09U.

Tropical Low 10U

On 7 January, a weak tropical low had developed within a monsoonal trough of low pressure over the Cape York Peninsula, before moving into the Gulf of Carpentaria. After eventually moving into TCWC Perth's area of responsibility by 9 January, the low was designated as 10U as it was moving over land. After moving southward over Western Australia, TCWC Perth issued its final bulletin on 12 January.

Tropical Low 11U

On 7 January, the BoM noted that a tropical low had formed, and was called 11U. It started to intensify slowly until it reached its peak intensity at 1000 mbar. The peak was short-lived as it started to weaken gradually and was last noted on 8 January.

Tropical Low 14U

On 23 January, a tropical low developed over in the western area of the Gulf of Carpentaria. After moving west-southwestward over land, the low gradually developed and was designated as 14U during 26 January. During the next day, the JTWC began issuing advisories, classifying it as 03S as it moved over water. Thereafter, 14U moved over cooler waters causing deep convection to dissipate, and both the JTWC and BoM issued their final advisories on 28 January.

Tropical Low 15U

A tropical low formed off the Pilbara coastline near Broome on 7 February and slowly strengthened while moving westwards. The system made landfall as a low during 8 February near Karratha. The system dropped  of rainfall on at Karratha Airport, giving it its wettest February day on record and its second-wettest day overall. The low progressively moved southwestwards over the western Pilbara and Gascoyne region before moving back offshore between Carnarvon and Shark Bay.

During the night of 9 February the low linked up with a trough lying over the southwest of the country, resulting in both abnormally low temperatures and heavy rainfall across the region, with the area within 100 km of a line from Perth to Esperance the hardest hit. Widespread flooding resulted in access to towns such as Wagin and Gnowangerup being cut off while the South Coast Highway crossing the Phillips River was washed away, resulting in no access between Jerramungup and Ravensthorpe. The Avon River experienced major flooding around Northam resulting in evacuations. The main river system in Perth, the Swan, also had flood warnings issued for the second time in as many weeks. Two people were confirmed killed in the Esperance region due to driving into floodwaters.

Despite the tropical origins of the system, the thick cloud cover over the area also resulted in records for the coldest February maximum temperatures being broken. Perth achieved a maximum temperature of just  on 9 February, over 14 °C below the monthly average, beating its previous record of  set in 1914. These temperatures were in stark contrast to the eastern states of Australia, which were experiencing a major heatwave during the same time.

Tropical Low 16U

Tropical Low 17U

Tropical Cyclone Alfred

On the night of 15 February, a tropical low had formed near Borroloola. The tropical low remained slow-moving near the southern Gulf of Carpentaria coast for a number of days before moving over open waters on 19 February. The tropical low gradually intensified while moving north towards Groote Eylandt before turning back towards the southeast. The low intensified into a Category 1 tropical cyclone on the Australian cyclone intensity scale on the morning of 20 February, and was named Alfred. Alfred remained a Category 1 tropical cyclone for almost 24 hours before weakening below cyclone strength, just before crossing the coast of the Gulf of Carpentaria, in the early afternoon of 21 February. The system dissipated on the next day. Alfred was the first tropical cyclone to hit the Northern Territory since Cyclone Nathan in 2015.

Tropical Cyclone Blanche

Early on 2 March, TCWC Darwin noted a developing tropical low in the north Arafura Sea, followed promptly by the JTWC that afternoon. TCWC Darwin began issuing advisories on the tropical low at 00:00 UTC on 4 March. Embedded within a moderate to high wind shear regime, the system was expected to track south or southwest into a more favourable environment over subsequent days. By 00:00 UTC on 5 March, the low had moved underneath an anticyclone, providing excellent outflow which offset the negative effects from continued wind shear. In accordance with satellite intensity estimates, the TCWC Darwin upgraded the low to Tropical Cyclone Blanche.

With increasing deep convection and a more consolidated centre of circulation, the JTWC issued a Tropical Cyclone Formation Alert at 02:00 UTC on 5 March, and designated the system as Tropical Cyclone 10S shortly thereafter at 15:00 UTC. Around 03:00 UTC that day, Blanche moved ashore a largely uninhabited region of western Australia, the latest instance of the country's first tropical cyclone landfall for any season on record. Once inland, the cyclone began to weaken as its mid-level circulation became dislocated from its low-level circulation, and as dry air became more prevalent. Land observations indicated that the system weakened below tropical cyclone intensity by 09:00 UTC.

Prior to becoming a tropical cyclone, the precursor tropical low to Blanche led to a 24-hour record-breaking  of rainfall on Point Fawcett in the Tiwi Islands, surpassing the previous record of  set by Cyclone Carlos in 2011. Although expected to steer clear of the Coral Sea, some experts hoped that widespread cloudiness from the developing system would result in cooler ocean temperatures across the region, negating an ongoing coral bleaching event in the Great Barrier Reef. Passing close but ultimately west of Darwin, officials opened three public shelters and urged citizens to shelter in place as conditions deteriorated. The Darwin River Dam spillway was topped to ease potential flooding, and additional staff were allocated at local hospitals. The city recorded substantial rainfall of  within a 24-hour period. On 5 March, the Department of Fire and Emergency Services issued a "blue alert" stretching from the Western Australia–Northern Territory border to Kuri Bay in the Kimberley, while a "yellow alert" was hoisted from Wyndham to Kalumburu as Blanche neared the coastline of Western Australia. Roadways were shut down due to street flooding. East Kimberly Regional Airport recorded  while nearby Wyndham documented .

Tropical Low 21U

Tropical Cyclone 22U
On 21 March, TCWC Perth began monitoring and issuing warnings for a developing tropical low in the Indian Ocean off the Pilbara coast. The system was forecast to have a moderate chance of reaching Category 1 strength on the Australian tropical cyclone intensity scale on the afternoon of 23 March, prior to landfall. At around 18:00 UTC on 21 March, the Bureau of Meteorology issued another forecast track map for Tropical Low 22U, which predicted the system to make landfall near Sherlock Station, halfway between Whim Creek and Roebourne, on the night of 23 March, at the initially predicted intensity of Category 1. Post analysis determined that the system briefly reached tropical cyclone intensity just before making landfall. Port Hedland Airport recorded a period of gale-force winds with a peak wind gust of 94 km/h.

Tropical Cyclone Caleb

The low proceeded to move in a southeasterly direction. During 24 March, gales had developed around the system, and it was classified as a Category 1 tropical cyclone on the Australian cyclone intensity scale at 06:00 UTC on the same day. Caleb developed slowly over the next 48 hours as it drifted towards the south. By early 27 March, Caleb had weakened below cyclone strength due to a combination of dry air and cooler sea surface temperatures.

Severe Tropical Cyclone Debbie

On 22 March, a weak but well-defined area of low pressure developed over the Coral Sea, near the Louisiade Archipelago of Papua New Guinea. On the next day, the BoM classified the system as a tropical low. The system intensified into a Category 1 tropical cyclone on the Australian tropical cyclone intensity scale at 00:00 UTC on 25 March, and was subsequently named Debbie. Assuming a course to the southwest, the system developed into a Category 2 cyclone by 12:00 UTC on 25 March, and maintained this strength until the early morning of 27 March (local time) due to less favourable conditions for intensification. As favourable atmospheric conditions returned, Debbie underwent a period of rapid intensification, strengthening to a Category 4 severe tropical cyclone in 12 hours. Debbie made landfall on the Queensland coast near Airlie Beach at 02:40 UTC on 28 March as a strong Category 4 system. The system weakened steadily as it moved inland, falling to Category 3 by 06:00 UTC while located near Proserpine, Category 2 while near Collinsville a few hours afterwards, and Category 1 by 16:00 UTC. The system was downgraded to a tropical low at about 17:00 UTC, and began to accelerate while making a gradual transition to a southeasterly course. Ex-Tropical Cyclone Debbie moved into the Pacific Ocean on the night of Thursday 30 March (local time).

Ex-Tropical Cyclone Debbie caused widespread damage, especially due to extremely high rainfall totals, as it tracked down the Queensland coast. The torrential rainfall in the region caused the overflowing of the Pioneer River, and the subsequent need for nearly 100 people to be rescued from floodwaters in western Mackay. South of Mackay, the Plane Creek Sugar Mill in Sarina recorded at least  of rainfall. As the low-pressure system continued to move down the coast, the Fitzroy River region experienced 48-hour rainfall totals exceeding  in many places. Severe flooding also occurred in the Logan, Albert and Tweed Rivers, inundating Logan and parts of northern New South Wales, such as Murwillumbah and Lismore. As a result of the deluge in South East Queensland, more than half of the region's dams were left above capacity. Overall, Ex-Tropical Cyclone Debbie broke rainfall records at 62 weather stations in Queensland.

Throughout its lifetime, Severe Tropical Cyclone Debbie claimed the lives of 14 people in Queensland and New South Wales. The majority of these fatalities resulted from the remnant low-pressure system rather than the cyclone itself. Total economic losses from the cyclone reached A$3.5 billion (US$2.67 billion USD). This figure surpassed the initial prediction of A$2 billion (US$1.55 billion), which incorporated an estimated $1.5 billion loss in coal exports, $270 million in damage to crops such as sugar cane, a $120–280 million impact on tourism in the Whitsunday region, and physical damage to both public and private property. In total, more than 72,000 calls for assistance were made after the cyclone, which is more than were made after Severe Tropical Cyclone Yasi in 2011. As a result of the widespread and devastating impacts of Severe Tropical Cyclone Debbie, the Bureau of Meteorology officially retired the name Debbie from its naming list.

Severe Tropical Cyclone Ernie

The system tracked south-westwards throughout the day, before adopting a course to the south-southwest during the night. On the morning of 6 April local time, sustained gales developed on the western side of the system, however it was still classified as a tropical low as the winds did not extend more than halfway around the storm.

Steady intensification continued, and the storm was upgraded to Category 1 on the Australian tropical cyclone intensity scale by 12:00 UTC on the same day. The cyclone was assigned the name Ernie – the seventh cyclone and sixth named storm of the season. Aided by favourable environmental conditions including sea surface temperatures of 29–30 °C, the cyclone maintained its Category 5 intensity for more than 12 hours.

As the system turned to the west-southwest, it encountered increased wind shear, dryer air and cooler sea surface temperatures, and began to weaken. The storm was downgraded to Category 3 status by 12:00 UTC on 8 April, but began to re-intensify slightly on the morning of 9 April local time. This renewed strengthening was brief, however, as Ernie began weakening again in the afternoon of the same day. The cyclone was downgraded below severe tropical cyclone status by 12:00 UTC on 9 April, and further to Category 1 status by 00:00 UTC the next day. Ernie weakened below cyclone intensity by 06:00 UTC on 10 April, however gales persisted on the southern side of the system for a number of hours due to the steep pressure gradient caused by a high pressure ridge to the south. Ex-Tropical Cyclone Ernie continued to track to the west-southwest until the remnants of the system dissipated three days later.

Throughout its lifetime, Severe Tropical Cyclone Ernie remained over the Indian Ocean, far to the northwest of Western Australia and east of Christmas Island and the Cocos (Keeling) Islands. As a consequence, the cyclone did not have any impacts on land despite its extremely strong winds.

Tropical Low 27U

Tropical Low 27U originated as a slow-moving area of low pressure in an active monsoon trough in the eastern Arafura Sea off the west coast of New Guinea on 6 April. It initially tracked to the west-southwest while gradually intensifying before adopting a general southerly course. TCWC Darwin began issuing tropical cyclone warnings and forecast track maps for the tropical low, and initially predicted the system to reach Category 2 intensity on the Australian tropical cyclone intensity scale by 12 April. Despite the forecast intensification of Tropical Low 27U, a combination of factors such as land interaction with the northwest Top End and the displacement of the lower-level and upper-level circulation centres of the system due to high vertical wind shear significantly limited development, and ultimately began to degrade the system. The Bureau of Meteorology issued its final warning regarding the system on the afternoon of 12 April, which, coincidentally, was the time at which it was originally forecast to become a Category 2 cyclone. The system persisted as a tropical low while tracking west-southwestwards across the Timor Sea and into the Indian Ocean, passing very close to the Kimberley coast in the process.

Severe Tropical Cyclone Frances

The tropical low strengthened slowly while moving westwards across the Arafura Sea. The low passed south of the Aru Islands during 24 and 25 April.

During the night of 26 April, the low started moving in a southwest direction while undergoing a period of rapid intensification. Frances continued to move in a southwest direction over the Timor Sea, continuing to rapidly intensify. Frances reached Category 3 severe tropical cyclone strength by the afternoon of 28 April, just 24 hours after reaching tropical cyclone intensity. Frances maintained Category 3 strength until the morning of 29 April, where it rapidly weakened due to increasingly unfavorable atmospheric conditions, becoming a tropical low on the morning of 30 April.

Tropical Cyclone Greg

The low had a compact and well defined circulation, with atmospheric convection wrapping into it as it moved southwards. During that day, the system turned westwards and weakened below tropical cyclone intensity into a remnant low during 1 May. Over the next few days, Greg's remnants were tracked, as they moved westwards out of the Australian region, before they dissipated during 4 May.

Other systems
Ahead of the season starting on 1 November, the Bureau of Meteorology, monitored two weak tropical lows that developed within the central Indian Ocean. The first noted as it developed within a monsoon trough to the northwest of Christmas Island during 23 September, but was not expected to develop any further as it moved southwards towards the Australian territory. Over the next couple of days, the system moved south-westwards while its low-level circulation centre gradually consolidated, with the system's chance of becoming a short-lived tropical cyclone improving during 13 October. However, during the next day, the chances of the system developing into a tropical cyclone weakened, as a moderate to high amount of vertical wind shear impacted the low. The system was subsequently monitored over the next few days before they were last noted during 19 October after they had moved into the South-West Indian Ocean.

On 9 November, TCWC Perth started to monitor another tropical low. TCWC Perth also stated that it had a chance of becoming a tropical cyclone. After moving into unfavourable environments such as high shear, TCWC Perth issued its final bulletin during 15 November.

On 25 November, TCWC Perth started monitoring a weak tropical low to the southwest of Lampung. 

 The system was subsequently classified as Tropical Disturbance 03F on 29 November by the Fiji Meteorological Service before it was last noted during 30 November while located to the north of Nouméa, New Caledonia.

A weak tropical low developed to the south of Bali on 4 December, though due to unfavourable conditions the system soon weakened to a low-pressure area.  The system was last noted on 17 December.

On 3 January, a tropical low was located inland Australia to the southwest of the Top End. The system was given a "moderate" chance of strengthening into a tropical cyclone during the next day, however the system remained over land while moving southwest and did not develop further. TCWC Perth continued monitoring the system until 7 January when the tropical low was located over the border of East Pilbara and North Interior.

On 18 January, a tropical low had persisted over in the far northwest in the Indian Ocean until it was last noted the next day.

Similar to the previous system, another tropical low persisted over in the far northwest of the Western Region on 21 January. The low did not intensify and dissipated to the south of the island of Sumatra on 25 January.

Tropical Low 18U developed on 16 February off the western coast of Kimberley. During the next day, the low had emerged over open waters while near the Pilbara coast. The system had moved in a westerly direction until it was last noted on 22 February.

Storm names

During the season, a total of eight tropical cyclones received a name from the BoM, either by TCWC Perth, Darwin, or Brisbane; the names are listed below. This was done when the system in question was judged to have 10-minute sustained wind speeds of  that extended at least halfway around the system. There has only been one list from which the Bureau of Meteorology has assigned names to tropical cyclones since the 2008–09 season. Cyclones named by TCWC Jakarta and Port Moresby are rare, with the last named cyclones occurring during 2014 and 2007, respectively.

As a consequence of the devastating impacts of Severe Tropical Cyclone Debbie in March, the Bureau of Meteorology officially retired the name Debbie from the naming list.

Season effects
This is a table of all the storms that formed in the 2016–17 Australian region cyclone season. It includes their duration, names, landfall(s), denoted in parentheses, damages, and death totals. Deaths in parentheses are additional and indirect (an example of an indirect death would be a traffic accident), but were still related to that storm. Damage and deaths include totals while the storm was extratropical, a wave, or a low, and all the damage figures are in 2016 AUD and USD.

|-
| 01U ||  || bgcolor=#|Tropical low || bgcolor=#| || bgcolor=#| || None || None || None ||
|-
| 02U ||  || bgcolor=#|Tropical low || bgcolor=#| || bgcolor=#| || None || None || None ||
|-
| 03U ||  || bgcolor=#|Tropical low || bgcolor=#| || bgcolor=#| || None || None || None ||
|-
| 03F ||  || bgcolor=#|Tropical low || bgcolor=#| || bgcolor=#| || Solomon Islands || None || None ||
|-
| 04U ||  || bgcolor=#|Tropical low || bgcolor=#| || bgcolor=#| || None || None || None ||
|-
| 05U ||  || bgcolor=#|Tropical low || bgcolor=#| || bgcolor=#| || None || None || None ||
|-
| 06U ||  || bgcolor=#|Tropical low || bgcolor=#| || bgcolor=#| || Western Australia || None || None ||
|-
| Yvette ||  || bgcolor=#|Category 1 tropical cyclone || bgcolor=#| || bgcolor=#| || Western Australia || None || None ||
|-
| 08U ||  || bgcolor=#|Tropical low || bgcolor=#| || bgcolor=#| || Northern Territory, Western Australia || None || None || None ||
|-
| 09U ||  || bgcolor=#|Tropical low || bgcolor=#| || bgcolor=#| || Cocos (Keeling) Islands,Christmas Island || None || None || None ||
|-
| 10U ||  || bgcolor=#|Tropical low || bgcolor=#| || bgcolor=#| || Northern Territory || None || None || None ||
|-
| 11U ||  || bgcolor=#|Tropical low || bgcolor=#| || bgcolor=#| || Queensland || None || None || None ||
|-
| 12U ||  || bgcolor=#|Tropical low || bgcolor=#| || bgcolor=#| || None || None || None || None ||
|-
| 13U ||  || bgcolor=#|Tropical low || bgcolor=#| || bgcolor=#| || None || None || None || None ||
|-
| 14U ||  || bgcolor=#|Tropical low || bgcolor=#| || bgcolor=#| || Northern Territory, Western Australia || None || None || None ||
|-
| 15U ||  || bgcolor=#|Tropical low || bgcolor=#| || bgcolor=#| || Western Australia ||  ||  || 2 ||
|-
| 16U ||  || bgcolor=#|Tropical low || bgcolor=#| || bgcolor=#| || New Caledonia || None || None ||
|-
| 17U ||  || bgcolor=#|Tropical low || bgcolor=#| || bgcolor=#| || Northern Territory || None || None ||
|-
| 18U ||  || bgcolor=#|Tropical low || bgcolor=#| || bgcolor=#| || None || None || None ||
|-
| Alfred ||  || bgcolor=#|Category 2 tropical cyclone || bgcolor=#| || bgcolor=#| || Queensland, Northern Territory ||  ||  ||
|-
| Blanche ||  || bgcolor=#|Category 2 tropical cyclone || bgcolor=#| || bgcolor=#| || Western Australia, Northern Territory ||  ||  ||
|-
| 21U ||  || bgcolor=#|Tropical low || bgcolor=#| || bgcolor=#| || None || None || None ||
|-
| 22U ||   || bgcolor=#|Category 2 tropical cyclone || bgcolor=#| || bgcolor=#| || Western Australia ||  ||  ||
|-
| Caleb ||  || bgcolor=#|Category 1 tropical cyclone || bgcolor=#| || bgcolor=#| || Cocos (Keeling) Islands || None || None || None ||
|-
| Debbie ||  || bgcolor=#|Category 4 severe tropical cyclone || bgcolor=#| || bgcolor=#| || Queensland, New South Wales,New Zealand ||  ||  || 14 ||
|-
| 25U ||  || bgcolor=#|Tropical low || bgcolor=#| || bgcolor=#| || None || None || None || None ||
|-
| Ernie ||  || bgcolor=#|Category 5 severe tropical cyclone || bgcolor=#| || bgcolor=#| || None || None || None || None ||
|-
| 27U ||  || bgcolor=#|Tropical low || bgcolor=#| || bgcolor=#| || Northern Territory, Western Australia || None || None || None ||
|-
| Frances ||  || bgcolor=#|Category 3 severe tropical cyclone || bgcolor=#| || bgcolor=#| || New Guinea, Maluku, Northern Territory,Timor, Western Australia || None || None || None ||
|-
| Greg ||  || bgcolor=#|Category 1 tropical cyclone || bgcolor=#| || bgcolor=#| || None ||  ||  ||
|-

See also

Weather of 2016 and 2017
2016–17 South Pacific cyclone season
2016–17 South-West Indian Ocean cyclone season
Atlantic hurricane seasons: 2016, 2017
Australian region tropical cyclone
List of Southern Hemisphere tropical cyclone seasons
North Indian Ocean cyclone seasons: 2016, 2017
Pacific hurricane seasons: 2016, 2017
Pacific typhoon seasons: 2016, 2017
South Atlantic tropical cyclone
Tropical cyclones in 2016 and 2017

References

External links
 Australian Bureau of Meteorology
 Joint Typhoon Warning Center 
 Tropical Cyclone Warning Center Jakarta 

 
Australian region cyclone seasons
2016 Aus
2017 Aus